The Moorefield School is a historic former school building on Ham Street in Moorefield, Arkansas.  It is a broad rectangular single-story building built out of fieldstone, with a gable-on-hip roof that has exposed rafter ends in the Craftsman style. Entrances on the north and west sides are set under parapeted square porches. The school was built in 1936–37 with funding from the National Youth Administration and served the community as a school until 1947. It now houses the Rehoboth Baptist Church.

The building was listed on the National Register of Historic Places in 1992.

See also
National Register of Historic Places listings in Independence County, Arkansas

References

School buildings on the National Register of Historic Places in Arkansas
National Register of Historic Places in Independence County, Arkansas
National Youth Administration
School buildings completed in 1937
Baptist churches in Arkansas
Schools in Independence County, Arkansas
1937 establishments in Arkansas
Bungalow architecture in Arkansas
American Craftsman architecture in Arkansas